The 2007 Pacific Life Open women's singles was the women's singles event of the 2007 Pacific Life Open, a WTA Tier I tennis tournament held in March. Maria Sharapova was the defending champion, but lost in the fourth round to Vera Zvonareva.

Daniela Hantuchová defeated Svetlana Kuznetsova in the final, 6–3, 6–4, to win the tournament for the second time.

Seeds
All seeds received a bye into the second round.

Draw

Finals

Top half

Section 1

Section 2

Section 3

Section 4

Bottom half

Section 5

Section 6

Section 7

Section 8

References

External links 
 Draw

Women's Singles